Camberwell tram depot is located on Council Street, Hawthorn East, a suburb of Melbourne, Australia. Opened in December 1929, it is operated by Yarra Trams. It is one of eight tram depots on the Melbourne tram network.

History
In July 1928 the Melbourne & Metropolitan Tramways Board (MMTB) approved the acquisition of a number of properties on Camberwell Road, west of Camberwell Junction, in preparation for the construction of a new tram depot. A tender for £31,990 to construct the depot was accepted on 1 November 1928 by the MMTB, with the depot opening in December 1929. The opening of Camberwell depot ushered in a multitude of operational changes in the eastern part of the tram network, including extended hours of tramway operation.

Traffic lights were installed on Riversdale Road, at the entrance to Camberwell depot in 1948, to increase safety. The traffic lights were in response to a large number of near misses, and were activated by trams.

When the Public Transport Corporation was privatised in August 1999, Camberwell depot passed to Yarra Trams.

Layout 

Camberwell tram depot has nine roads, all of which are covered by a single 115 foot single span roof. This is said to increase safety within the depot shed as there are no columns, while also providing better lighting. The depot shed is connected to Riversdale Road by a double track entrance. The staff facilities and offices are in an adjacent building.

Rolling stock
As of May 2022, the depot had an allocation of 56 trams: 3 A1-class, 20 A2-class and 33 B2-class.

Routes
The following routes are operated from Camberwell depot:
70: Waterfront City Docklands to Wattle Park 
75: Central Pier Docklands to Vermont South

References

Tram depots in Melbourne
Transport infrastructure completed in 1929
1929 establishments in Australia
Transport in the City of Boroondara
Buildings and structures in the City of Boroondara